On 16 March 2016,  bomb detonated in a bus carrying government employees in Peshawar, Pakistan, killing 15 and injuring at least 30. The explosion occurred on Sunehri Masjid Road. The bomb had been hidden on the bus, and was apparently detonated remotely. A group aligned with the Pakistani Taliban claimed responsibility for the bombing.

References 

21st-century mass murder in Pakistan
Mass murder in 2016
Terrorist incidents in Pakistan in 2016
History of Peshawar
Terrorist incidents in Peshawar
March 2016 crimes in Asia
March 2016 events in Pakistan
2016 murders in Pakistan